The Under Secretary of War was a position created by an act of 16 December 1940 (54 Stat. 1224). At the same time, section 5a of the National Defense Act (1920) was amended to allow the United States Secretary of War to assign his responsibilities for procurement to any of his subordinates. The statute formerly assigned these responsibilities to the United States Assistant Secretary of War. The Assistant Secretary of War, Robert P. Patterson was nominated and confirmed in the post. The Secretary of War delegated his responsibilities for procurement to the Under Secretary on 28 April 1941. By November 1941 the Office of the Under Secretary of War (OUSW) employed 1,136 people, of whom 257 were military officers and the remainder civilians.

List of Under Secretaries of War
The position of the Under Secretary of War was held by the following:

Notes

References

United States Department of War